Sergeant Harold Jackson VC (31 May 1892 − 24 August 1918) was a British Army soldier and an English recipient of the Victoria Cross (VC), the highest and most prestigious award for gallantry in the face of the enemy that can be awarded to British and Commonwealth forces. A soldier with the East Yorkshire Regiment, he was awarded the VC for his actions in March 1918, during the German spring offensive of the First World War. He was killed in action five months later.

Early life
Jackson was born on 31 May 1892 to Thomas and Ann Jackson, and lived in Allandales, Kirton, in Lincolnshire county. After working as a drayman, he moved to Nottingham in about 1912 or 1913 and worked on the railways there. He later started working as a bricklayer for a building company.

First World War
Jackson joined the British Army in April 1915, eight months after the British entry into World War I, and was posted to the 18th Hussars (later the 18th Royal Hussars), a cavalry regiment. As a trooper, he was dispatched to France for service on the Western Front. After a few months he was transferred to the East Yorkshire Regiment, a line infantry regiment, and assigned to the 7th (Service) Battalion of his new regiment, a recently-raised Kitchener's Army unit made up of civilian volunteers. He participated in the capture of Fricourt, on the opening day of the Battle of the Somme on 1 July 1916, and was wounded two weeks later during the Battle of Bazentin Ridge. Repatriated to England for medical treatment and on recovery served with a reserve battalion before rejoining the 7th East Yorkshires in 1917.

During the German spring offensive of 1918, Jackson's battalion were tasked with the defence of Hermies. On 22 March, Jackson, now a sergeant, volunteered for an intelligence gathering patrol, which had to be conducted while the Germans laid down an artillery barrage. Later the same day, he was heavily involved in fighting off a German attack that initially penetrated his battalion's position and then put a machine-gun post out of action. Over the following days, the regiment conducted a fighting retreat. Near Albert, on 31 March, he took command of his company after all the officers had been killed or wounded and even retrieved wounded men while under fire. For his actions over the period 22 to 31 March 1918, he was awarded the Victoria Cross (VC). The VC, instituted in 1856, was the highest award for valour that could be bestowed on a soldier of the British Empire.

 The citation for his VC read as follows:

Jackson received his VC ribbon from Lieutenant General Cameron Shute, commander of V Corps, on 18 May. He returned to England to be presented with the VC medal itself; this ceremony took place at Buckingham Palace on 26 June. A public reception was later held for him at his home town of Kirton.

After a period of leave, he returned to his battalion, which was still on the Western Front. He was killed in action at Thiepval, France on 24 August 1918. Originally buried near where he was killed, in 1927 his remains were relocated to the AIF Burial Ground at Flers. He is commemorated on several memorials; that in his home town, one in Boston and at Wood Green in London.

The medal
Jackson's medals also included the 1914–15 Star, British War Medal, and the Victory Medal. His sister, Mary Searby, had possession of his VC and later lent it to her father, Thomas Jackson, for a function at Buckingham Palace. The VC remained with him until his death, at which time it was returned to Searby. It was later passed onto her niece in the mid-1950s. It, along with Jackson's other medals, was sold to a private collector in 1989.

References

Bibliography

External links

1892 births
1918 deaths
18th Royal Hussars soldiers
Military personnel from Lincolnshire
People from Kirton, Lincolnshire
East Yorkshire Regiment soldiers
British Army personnel of World War I
British World War I recipients of the Victoria Cross
British military personnel killed in World War I
British Army recipients of the Victoria Cross
Burials at the AIF Burial Ground